Pulivendla Assembly constituency is a constituency of the Andhra Pradesh Legislative Assembly, India. It is one of 7 constituencies in the Kadapa district.

Y. S. Jagan Mohan Reddy, the incumbent chief minister of Andhra Pradesh, is the present MLA of the constituency, who won the 2019 Andhra Pradesh Legislative Assembly election from YSR Congress Party.

Overview 
It is part of the Kadapa Lok Sabha constituency along with another six Vidhan Sabha segments, namely, Badvel, Kadapa, Kamalapuram, Jammalamadugu, Proddatur and Mydukur in Kadapa district.

Mandals

Members of Legislative Assembly

Election results

Assembly Elections 2004

Assembly Elections 2009

By Election 2010

By Election 2011

Assembly elections 2014

Assembly elections 2019

See also 
 List of constituencies of Andhra Pradesh Legislative Assembly

References 

Assembly constituencies of Andhra Pradesh